Tropidurus is a genus of reptiles. The genus  includes many species of Neotropical ground lizards (family Tropiduridae). Tropidurus is the type genus of the family Tropiduridae.

Geographic range and habitat
Species in the genus Tropidurus are found on the South American mainland, especially in the Amazon Rainforest, but also in more arid regions.

Common name
No widely common name is used solely for species of the genus Tropidurus. In their native range, they are simply called "Lagartixa" as are most similar animals. If anything, the Brazilian term calango is used to particularly refer to lizards of the genus Tropidurus.

Taxonomy
The genus Tropidurus contains 30 described species, but new ones continue to be discovered. An additional seven species—the Galápagos lava lizards endemic to the Galápagos Islands—are sometimes placed here, too, but more commonly separated in the genus Microlophus, instead. Similarly, the green thornytail iguana and tropical thorny iguana are now often separated into the minor, but probably distinct Uracentron lineage, instead. In this article, these two genera are kept separate, while Platynotus, Strobilurus, and Tapinurus are included in Tropidurus.

Description
Males and females of all Tropidurus species are marked differently. The male is usually much larger than the female, and his body is more brightly coloured and distinctly patterned. The typical size of Tropidurus lizards varies greatly from habitat to habitat as does the pattern of body markings, even among individuals of the same species. Like many lizards, they show changes of colour with mood and temperature.

Species

These species are recognized as being valid:

Tropidurus azurduyae 
Tropidurus bogerti  – keeled lava lizard
Tropidurus callathelys 
Tropidurus catalanensis 
Tropidurus chromatops 
Tropidurus cocorobensis 
Tropidurus erythrocephalus 
Tropidurus etheridgei  – Etheridge's lava lizard
Tropidurus guarani 
Tropidurus helenae 
Tropidurus hispidus  – Peters's lava lizard, neotropical lava lizard
Tropidurus hygomi  – Reinhardt's lava lizard
Tropidurus imbituba 
Tropidurus insulanus 
Tropidurus itambere 
Tropidurus jaguaribanus 
Tropidurus lagunablanca 
Tropidurus melanopleurus  – black lava lizard
Tropidurus montanus 
Tropidurus mucujensis 
Tropidurus oreadicus 

Tropidurus pinima 
Tropidurus psammonastes 
Tropidurus semitaeniatus  – striped lava lizard
Tropidurus sertanejo 
Tropidurus spinulosus  – spiny lava lizard
Tropidurus torquatus  – Amazon lava lizard
Tropidurus xanthochilus 

Nota bene: A binomial authority in parentheses indicates that the species was originally described in a genus other than Tropidurus.

References

Further reading
Wied-Neuwied M (1824). "Verzeichniss der Amphibien, welche in zweyten Bande der Naturgeschichte Brasiliens vom Prinz Max von Neuwied werden beschrieben werden. (Nach Merrems Versuch eines Systems Amphibien) ". Isis von Oken 14: 661–673. (Tropidurus, new genus, p. 663). (in German).

Tropidurus
Lizard genera
Taxa named by Prince Maximilian of Wied-Neuwied